Bill Reiboldt (born August 1, 1948) is an American politician. He was a member of the Missouri House of Representatives, having served from 2011 to 2019. He is a member of the Republican party.

References

1948 births
21st-century American politicians
Living people
Republican Party members of the Missouri House of Representatives